Olympic Hot Doughnuts was a local business operating in Footscray, Victoria, Australia, selling hot jam doughnuts outside the Footscray railway station on Irving Street. The business operated outside the station from 1979 until its closure in early 2017.

Background
Olympic Hot Doughnuts was started by Greek immigrant Nick Tsiligiris outside the Footscray station in the Irving St forecourt in 1979.

For more than 40 years the business operated out of two run-down old caravans on the station forecourt, selling jam doughnuts for 80 cents each. However, from 2012 to 2014 the station and Irving Street forecourt underwent a major development as part of the Regional Rail Link project.

There was much speculation about the business's future, as all the other shops on the station side of Irving Street had been demolished. However, due to insistence from local residents and traders that it would have a negative impact on Footscray should the business be made to move on, it was eventually announced that Olympic Hot Doughnuts would remain.

For more than a year the caravans were moved around the forecourt via crane while construction crews continued to develop the new station. And in 2014 – two new kiosks popped up close to the new station entrance. It was eventually announced that one of those kiosks would be for Olympic Hot Doughnuts and a public open day was held on 9 July 2014. Former premier Denis Napthine was in attendance. The old caravans were sent to the Melbourne Museum for exhibition.

In 2015, filmmakers Ian Tran and Rachael Morssink made a short documentary about Olympic Hot Doughnuts, titled Olympic Nick: a donutumentary'. In the eleven minute film the station rebuild period was reexamined, and other Footscray traders were asked for their opinions on Tsiligiris and Olympic Hot Doughnuts. It was also revealed by one of the community advisers for Footscray from the former Regional Rail Link Authority that Tsiligiris prior to the establishment of the kiosk did not in fact have a land title.

Closure 

In April 2016 Tsiligiris had a serious car accident and as a result was forced to close the shop for some time. As a result, rumours spread as to the fate of Tsiligiris with incorrect speculation he had died. As a result his family was forced to deny this was the case. However, in January 2017, Tsiligiris was forced to close Olympic Hot Doughnuts, due to ill health. In March 2017, it was announced that a new business would take over from Tsiligiris selling doughnuts in the kiosk.

Legacy

In May 2020, a Mural of Tsiligiris' face with the Olympic Doughnuts logo in the background was erected on Leeds Street, Footscray, not far from the station and original site of the former caravan and current kiosk, by a local artist. In April 2021 the State Library Victoria acquired a miniature model of the original Olympic Doughnuts Van made by artist David Hourigan.

Tsiligiris died on 21 October 2021.

References

Doughnut shops
Food manufacturers of Australia
Food and drink companies based in Melbourne
Australian short documentary films